The 2022 Busan Open was a professional tennis tournament played on hard courts. It was the 19th edition of the tournament which was part of the 2022 ATP Challenger Tour. It took place in Busan, South Korea between 17 and 23 October 2022.

Singles main-draw entrants

Seeds
* 1 Rankings as of 10 October 2022.

Other entrants
The following players received wildcards into the singles main draw:
  Chung Yun-seong
  Kwon Soon-woo
  Nam Ji-sung

The following player received entry into the singles main draw using a protected ranking:
  Marc Polmans

The following players received entry from the qualifying draw:
  Joris De Loore
  Shintaro Mochizuki
  Maximilian Neuchrist
  Max Purcell
  Mukund Sasikumar
  Keegan Smith

The following players received entry as lucky losers:
  Hong Seong-chan
  Marek Gengel
  Naoki Nakagawa

Champions

Singles

 Kamil Majchrzak def.  Radu Albot 6–4, 3–6, 6–2.

Doubles

 Marc Polmans /  Max Purcell def.  Nam Ji-sung /  Song Min-kyu 6–7(5–7), 6–2, [12–10].

References

2022 ATP Challenger Tour
2022
October 2022 sports events in South Korea
2022 in South Korean sport